1000 series may refer to:

Japanese train types
 Chichibu Railway 1000 series EMU, operated by the Chichibu Railway
 Choshi Electric Railway 1000 series EMU, operated by the Choshi Electric Railway
 Fukuoka Subway 1000 series EMU
 Hankyu 1000 series (1954) EMU, operated by Hankyu Corporation from 1954 to 1989
 Hankyu 1000 series EMU, operated by Hankyu Corporation since December 2013
 Hanshin 1000 series EMU, operated by the Hanshin Electric Railway
 JR Shikoku 1000 series DMU
 Keihan 1000 series EMU, operated by the Keihan Electric Railway
 Keikyu 1000 series EMU, operated by Keikyu
 Keikyu N1000 series EMU, operated by Keikyu
 Keio 1000 series (2nd generation) EMU, operated by Keio Corporation
 Meitetsu 1000 series EMU, operated by Meitetsu
 Nagano 1000 series EMU, operated by the Nagano Electric Railway
 Nagoya Municipal Subway N1000 series EMU
 Odakyu 1000 series EMU, operated by the Odakyu Electric Railway
 Osaka Monorail 1000 series EMU
 Sendai Subway 1000 series EMU
 Tokyo Metro 1000 series EMU
 Tokyo Monorail 1000 series EMU
 Tokyu 1000 series EMU
 Tōyō Rapid 1000 series EMU
 TX-1000 series EMU, operated by Tsukuba Express

Other
 ATP World Tour Masters 1000, a series of nine tennis tournaments
 GeForce 1000 Series, a graphics processing units

See also
 Class 1000 Shinkansen